The 2018–19 Basketligaen was the 44th season of the highest professional basketball tier in Denmark. The season started on 25 September 2018 and ended on 13 May 2019. Bakken Bears defended its title. Ryan Evans of the Bears was named the season's Most Valuable Player.

Competition format
Teams were divided into two groups: Pro A, joined by the best five teams in the previous season, and Pro B, by the rest of the team. Each team would play against each other of their same league four times, while only twice with teams from the other side.

The five teams of Pro A and the best three of Pro B qualified for playoffs.

Teams

After the end of the season, Hørsholm 79ers resigned to its place in the league. EBAA and Værløse joined the league.

Regular season

Pro A

Pro B

Results

Playoffs
The playoffs were played between the eight teams of the competition, with a best-of-five series in a 1-1-1-1-1 format. The seeded team played games 1, 3 and 5 at home. The Finals will be played in a best-of-seven series and the bronze medal series as a single game.

Bracket

Quarterfinals

|}

Semifinals

|}

Third place game

|}

Finals

|}

Danish clubs in European competitions

References

External links
Official Basketligaen website

Basketligaen seasons
Danish
Basketball
Basketball